Tír Conaill Harps Gaelic Athletics Club (GAC), (Irish: Cumann Lúthchleas Gael Cláirsigh Thír Conaill) is a Gaelic football club based in Glasgow, Scotland. The club plays Gaelic football at both senior and underage levels. Tir Conaill Harps is the biggest Gaelic football club in Scotland in terms of structure and has a fully integrated youth system fielding teams for all age groups. The club's colours are green and gold.

History
Tír Conaill Harps was formed in 1994 following an amicable break away from the Pearse Harps club by the underage football section, who left to form the club at a meeting in the Govanhill Neighbourhood Centre, in Glasgow's south side.

Tír Conaill is the Irish for the land of Connell, an ancient name for the area now mostly known as County Donegal in the northwest of Ireland. This reflects the long tradition of people from there settling in the area. A number of members and players have family links to the county.

Tír Conaill Harps is a community based registered charity which provides opportunities for young and old people to play and enjoy the Gaelic football. The club welcomes new members regardless of their ability or age. The club also provides access to a wide range of coaching and personal development opportunities for its members.

Mission Statement - To strengthen communities in Glasgow through the provision of Gaelic Sports for young people in an affordable, safe, and fun environment.

Home ground
The club is traditionally linked with Glasgow's South side and played their Gaelic football home games at the GAA-owned Pearse Park in Cambuslang. Formally known as East Field. The Park was the first GAA sports field in Glasgow and was made possible by the efforts of Eoin "Owenie" Kelly from County Fermanagh. After the GAA condemned the park for health and safety reasons, the club moved to Nethercraigs Sports Complex, Corkerhill using a rugby pitch. The club has a strong anti-drugs policy and, as a reward for this, Glasgow City Council constructed a Gaelic ground in Bellahouston Park for the club to play their home matches. However, the poor playing surface had seen the club forced to remain at nearby Nethercraigs. In 2015 the senior and junior teams played and trained at Thornliebank, at Boydstone Road. The pitch was of a good standard however with no changing facilities around this was never going to be a long-term solution. When the new board was voted in club chairman Anton Gallagher had looked at a number of locations to set up as a base. The harps finally opted for Cambuslang Rugby Club and as of 2019 the club base all games and training sessions for all levels at their new home in Cambuslang.

Mens Gaelic football

It took seven years from the club's formation for the success of the underage teams to finally come to fruition in the form of senior success. However, in the 2001 season, Tir Conaill Harps won their first major silverware, lifting the League and Championship titles. This was followed by a league win the following year. However, the Harps were unable to match their previous success having to wait a further four years before lifting another trophy when they won the 2006 Michael Davitt Shield.

The Harps were to enter another difficult spell ending the 2007 and 2008 season trophyless. The club had been without a manager since early in 2007 and the team was organised by the senior players. Harps recruited management duo and former Mulroy Gaels players, Stephen McFadden as manager and Michael Coyle as assistant manager. The team started the 2009 season brightly under the new management team beating Dúnedin Connolly in the Michael Davitt Shield Quarter-Final in Portobello. This was the Harps first victory over the Edinburgh side in 7 years. The good form was continued as they defeated the new Aberdeen/Dundee side at Stirling University to book a place in the final. On 30 April 2009, the Harps ended their three-year trophy drought by lifting the Davitt Shield. They beat city-rivals Glaschu Gaels 1–10 to 1–06 at Coatbridge.

With new manager Fergal Coffey now in charge of the club, 2012 would go on to become one of the Harps best season's on record, reaching all three major finals. The first being the league final which they lost to Edinburgh side Dunedin Connolly's 0–07 to 0-09. Both sides met again in the Davitt Shield Final. This time however the Harps were victorious, beating Connolly's 1–10 to 0-06. The most important win came though in the championship final. Tir Conaill Harps hadn't reached the final since they last won it back in 2001. The final itself was as entertaining as it comes. With the Harps dominating the game and leading by 11 points early in the second half, thanks to two quick goals from the restart, Dunedin Connolly's soon started a comeback. With only a minute left Connolly's edged a point in front. However, with the last play of the game, the ball was kicked into the goal area and Tir Conaill man Barry Russell rose above everyone else to punch the ball into the net and secure the championship for the Harps. Finally, Tir Conaill Harps long wait to bring the championship home was over. Things had been looking bright for the harps, but with the loss of some key players the club failed to build on the success of that championship win. Having reached the league final of 2013 and subsequently being beaten by Dunedin Connollys the club would fail to reach another major final for another 6 years. Unable to attract enough quality players to sustain a real challenge at senior level the harps decided to drop down to Junior level for the 2018 season. However, without the fixture of a fulltime manager in place the 2018 season would prove just as fruitless as the years before.

2019 would see big changes, and with a new board and chairman in place success was to follow. A committee was set up headed by one of Tir Conaill Haprs founding members Tommy Main and a five-year development plan was put in place to help the club get back to where it belonged. With the help of new club chairman Anton Gallagher producing a home base for the Harps in Cambuslang Rugby Club the Harps were in great position to finally kick on and bring success back to the club. And so it would prove with the instillation of club legend Adrian O'Duibhir as full time manager, the club won their first piece of silverware in over 7 years after beating Dalriada GFC in the league final to a score of 2–14 to 0-04. The success would continue at they met Dalriada GFC once again in the junior league championship final. Harps defeated their opponents 0–15 to 1–06 to clinch the double and cap of a wonderful season. In turn Tir Conaill Harps would be promoted, fielding teams at both Junior and Intermediate level for the following season. The beginning of the 2020 season would see club manager Adrian O'Duibhir depart for pastures new back home in his native Donegal.  This news was soon followed by the unveiling of Dave Kellett and Jimmy Houghton as the new management team for the 2020 season. As of 2022 the club fields one Intermediate team and will compete in the Scottish Intermediate/Senior League and Championship.

Ladies Gaelic Football

When the new board took over the club in 2019 one of the first objectives they set out was to reinstate the clubs senior ladies team.  However, due to coronavirus restrictions the formation of the ladies team had to be delayed. The club had fielded a ladies team in previous years, however due to the lack of proper structure within the club at the time  Tir Conaill Harps found it hard to find enough players after the first season and so the team was disbanded. However new club chairman Anton Gallagher saw it as a vital move for the club to establish a ladies team in order to keep the club progressing in the right direction. It was also vital to provide the girls from the youth section of the club  with the same opportunity as the boys to eventually progress into the senior side. 
So in 2021 the club pushed forward the promotion of new ladies team, and worked tirelessly to recruit players for the upcoming season. The Tir Conaill Harps Ladies played their first game in a Gaelic 7's tournament held in Edinburgh. Throughout the season the girls began to gel as a team and markable improvement could be seen with each passing game. The team is still in its formative stage having only played out one season so far, but the future looks very bright.

Tir Conaill Harps Youths

When Tír Conaill Harps was formed in 1994 following the amicable break away from the Pearse Harps the club initially solely focused on the youth. The senior teams where not formed until later on. The youth section of the club has always been a major focus and source of pride for the club. Since the formation they have continually progressed, competing and on many occasions winning tournaments held both at home and abroad. The pinnacle achievement came in 1999 when the Tir Conaill Harps under-16 team went all the way to the British Final and won. Most recently Tir Conaill Harps found success after winning the U-12's Scottish Championship for the first time in over a decade. With the foundations of the club firmly laid, the hard work from both the coaches and the players are now finally coming to fruition. The club currently fields teams at under-six, under-eight, under-ten, under-twelve, under-sixteen and under-eighteen level. It also has setups within many schools at both primary and secondary level within the Glasgow catchment area and is in the process of setting up a competitive schools league.

Honours
Gaelic football
Scottish Senior Championship Winners: 2001, 2012
Scottish Senior League Winners: 2001, 2002
Scottish Junior Championship Winners: 2019
Scottish Junior League Winners: 2019
Michael Davitt Shield Winners: 2006, 2009, 2012
Scottish Homegrown Championship Winners: 2014, 2016, 2018
Under 16s British Championship Winners: 1999
U12's Scottish Championship Winners: 2010, 2021

External links
 Official Website

Gaelic Athletic Association clubs in Britain